The 1988 "Expo 92" Grand Prix was the fourth race of the 1988 Grand Prix motorcycle racing season. It took place on the weekend of 29 April–1 May 1988 at the Circuito Permanente de Jerez.

While the race is called the EXPO 92 Grand Prix, the race is classified as the "Portuguese Grand Prix", despite the fact that it is not called that.

500 cc race report
Eddie Lawson on pole. Wayne Rainey got the start from Lawson and Kevin Schwantz.

Schwantz passed Lawson at the final hairpin, and after the first lap, the order was Rainey, Schwantz, Lawson, Christian Sarron and Kevin Magee.

Schwantz tried to close the gap to Rainey, but started to look behind him more than usual, and it seemed his Suzuki was having problems. Magee 3rd ahead of Lawson. Schwantz quickly dropped to 4th and looked at his rear wheel; he soon headed into the pits.

Lawson fought back and swapped the lead with Magee and then went after Rainey.

Catching up to Rainey who had led for 27 laps, Lawson had a very hard time getting past, but finally managed it.

500 cc classification

References

Spanish motorcycle Grand Prix
Expo 92
Expo 92 Grand Prix